Delaware is a state located in the Mid-Atlantic. According to the 2016 United States Census estimate, Delaware is the 6th least populous state with  inhabitants but the 2nd smallest by land area spanning  of land. Delaware is divided into three counties and contains 57 incorporated places consisting of cities, towns, and villages.

As of 2020, the largest municipality by population in Delaware is Wilmington with 70,898 residents, while the largest by area is Dover which spans .

List of municipalities

References 

Municipalities
Delaware
Delaware
Delaware